Kim Hyun-jung (born December 24, 1994), known professionally as Seola (stylized as SeolA), is a South Korean singer and actress, best known as a member of the South Korean-Chinese girl group WJSN.

Career

2016–present: Debut with WJSN 

Seola was revealed to be a member of WJSN and its "Sweet Unit" on December 24, 2015. WJSN debuted on February 25, 2016, with the release of their debut EP Would You Like?, including the lead singles "Mo Mo Mo" and "Catch Me".

In August 2016, Seola, alongside group members Exy, Soobin, Eunseo, Cheng Xiao, Yeoreum, and Dayoung collaborated with label mates Monsta X to form the unit "Y-Teen". Y-teen was a project unit group that promoted as CF models for KT’s phone fare service and would release EPs, music videos, and various entertainment content.

On May 2, 2018, Starship Entertainment and Fantagio collaborated to form a special four-member unit named WJMK, consisting of members of their respective girl groups WJSN and Weki Meki. The group is composed of four members: Yoojung, Doyeon, Seola, and Luda. On June 1, 2018, they released the single "Strong" along with a music video. 

On June 14, 2018, Seola released "Love Virus" for the soundtrack of What's Wrong with Secretary Kim alongside labelmate Kihyun.

In April 2021, WJSN's second sub-unit named The Black was formed with Seola and fellow members Exy, Bona, and Eunseo.

In January 2022, Seola released "100 percent" for the soundtrack of Best Mistake 3 with groupmate Yeonjung.

Discography

Soundtrack appearances

Filmography

Film

Television series

Web series

Television shows

Composition credits

References

External links

1994 births
Living people
K-pop singers
Singers from Seoul
Actresses from Seoul
South Korean women pop singers
Starship Entertainment artists
Cosmic Girls members
South Korean female idols
21st-century South Korean women singers
South Korean film actresses
South Korean web series actresses
South Korean television actresses
21st-century South Korean actresses